Ryazhsk is town and the administrative center of Ryazhsky District in Ryazan Oblast, Russia, located  south of Ryazan, the administrative center of the oblast. Population:    26,000 (1974).

History
It has been known to exist since 1502. In the late 16th century, it was a part of the Great Abatis Border and guarded the Ryazhsk portage from the Don to the Oka River.

Administrative and municipal status
Within the framework of administrative divisions, Ryazhsk serves as the administrative center of Ryazhsky District. As an administrative division, it is incorporated within Ryazhsky District as the town of district significance of Ryazhsk. As a municipal division, the town of district significance of Ryazhsk is incorporated within Ryazhsky Municipal District as Ryazhskoye Urban Settlement.

References

Notes

Sources

External links

Cities and towns in Ryazan Oblast
Ryazhsky Uyezd